Orthoraphium is a monotypic genus of flowering plants belonging to the family Poaceae. The only species is Orthoraphium roylei.

Its native range is Himalaya to Japan.

References

Poaceae
Monotypic Poaceae genera